The 2002 Winter Olympics, officially known by the International Olympic Committee as the XIX Olympic Winter Games, was an international multi-sport event held in Salt Lake City, Utah, United States, from 8 February through 24 February 2002. A total of 2399 athletes from 77 National Olympic Committees (NOCs) participated at the Games in 78 events across 15 disciplines.

New events were contested in these Games; skeleton (introduced for the first time at the 1928 Winter Olympics and not contested since 1948) was re-introduced with events for both men and women, while women's bobsleigh was added to the program. The 78 events in Salt Lake City were an increase from 68 in Nagano at the 1998 Winter Olympics. Both men and women competed at these Games.

A total of 407 athletes won at least one medal at the Games. Athletes from Norway topped the medal table with the most gold medals, winning 13 golds out of 25 total medals. Germany won the most medals overall with 36, of which 12 were gold. Host nation the United States won 34 medals, 10 of them gold. Athletes from 24 participating NOCs won at least one medal; and competitors from 18 won at least one gold medal. Athletes from Australia and China won their respective nations' first Winter Olympic gold medals, while the Croatian and Estonian delegations each won their first Winter Olympic medals of any color. Of the 407 medalists, 55 athletes won more than one medal of any color at the Games. Of the multiple medalists, 31 won at least one gold medal, and 13 won multiple gold medals.

A judging scandal in the pairs figure skating event, where it was revealed that a French judge was had been bribed to inflate the scores of the Russian pair, led to the declaration of joint Olympic champions in the pairs event. Georg Hackl of Germany finished in second in the men's luge singles event, becoming the first athlete to win a medal at five consecutive Games in the same individual event. The United States teams, in the four-man bobsleigh event, won the country's first bobsleigh medals in 46 years. The 2002 Games also saw the first Winter Olympics gold medalists of African origin: Vonetta Flowers of the United States in the women's bobsleigh event, and Canada's Jarome Iginla in men's ice hockey. The Games saw improved doping testing conditions; four medalists (three from Russia and one from Spain) were stripped of their medals as a result of doping disqualifications. Ole Einar Bjørndalen was the Games' most decorated athlete, winning four gold medals; Janica Kostelić was the best-performing female athlete with three golds and a silver medal. Finnish athlete Samppa Lajunen became the first person to win three Nordic combined gold medals at a single Olympics, while Simon Ammann of Switzerland, who had not won a FIS Ski Jumping World Cup event before the Games, was the surprise performer, winning the gold medal on both the normal and large hills.
{| id="toc" class="toc" summary="Contents"
| align="center" colspan=3 | Contents
|-
|
 Alpine skiing
 Biathlon
 Bobsleigh
 Cross-country skiing
 Curling
| valign=top|
 Figure skating
 Freestyle skiing
 Ice hockey
 Luge
 Nordic combined
| valign=top|
 Short track
 Skeleton
 Ski jumping
 Snowboarding
 Speed skating
|-
| align=center colspan=3 | Medal winner changes      Medal leaders      References
|}


Alpine skiing

Biathlon

Bobsleigh

Cross-country skiing

Curling

Figure skating

Freestyle skiing

Ice hockey

Luge

Nordic combined

Short track speed skating

Skeleton

Ski jumping

Snowboarding

Speed skating

Medal winner changes
A. Alain Baxter, representing Great Britain, originally placed third and was awarded the bronze medal. However, Baxter tested positive for methamphetamine, and was stripped of his medal. Baxter was later cleared of intentionally doping by the Court of Arbitration for Sport (CAS), but the International Olympic Committee did not re-award his medal. Benjamin Raich was promoted to bronze.
B. Johann Mühlegg of Spain originally won the 10 km/10 km pursuit, but nine days after the race he failed a doping test following his gold medal win in the 50 km classical race. In 2003, a CAS ruling against Mühlegg allowed the International Olympic Committee to strip him of his other medals. Norwegians Frode Estil and Thomas Alsgaard, who had originally tied in a dead heat for silver, were promoted to gold, while fourth-placed Per Elofsson was promoted to bronze.
C. Mühlegg had also won gold in the 30 km mass start event, and lost it following the CAS ruling in December 2003. Christian Hoffmann, Mikhail Botvinov and Kristen Skjeldal were all promoted one position each into gold, silver and bronze respectively.
D. Mühlegg won gold in the 50 km, but after the podium ceremony it emerged that he had failed a test for darbepoetin alfa, and was immediately stripped of his medal. Mikhail Ivanov, Andrus Veerpalu and Odd-Bjørn Hjelmeset were elevated to gold, silver and bronze respectively.
E. Russian skier Olga Danilova had finished the event in first, ahead of compatriot Larissa Lazutina and Canada's Beckie Scott. In June 2003, a Swiss court ruled that the IOC could rescind Lazutina's silver medal for a positive test for darbepoetin, promoting Scott to silver and Kateřina Neumannová to bronze. The CAS then ruled in December that Danilova's medal could also be rescinded for her failed darbepoetin test, leading to another change in the event standings. Scott and Neumannová were both promoted again, with Viola Bauer now getting the bronze.
F. Lazutina's silver medal in the 15 km event was also forfeited in 2003 following the Swiss court's ruling. Neumannová was again a beneficiary, being promoted to silver, while Lazutina's teammate Yuliya Chepalova was promoted to bronze. She failed a drug test later in her career, but her results were left unaffected.
G. Lazutina won gold in the 30 km classical race, but because of her failed doping test was stripped of the medal after the race. Gabriella Paruzzi was promoted to gold, Stefania Belmondo to silver and Bente Skari to bronze.
H. Canada's Salé and Pelletier finished second based on the original judges' scores. However, following the revelation of a collusion between the Russian officials and a French judge, the original scores were thrown out and Salé and Pelletier were elevated to joint-gold with the Russian pair.

Medal leaders

Athletes who won at least two gold medals or three total medals are listed below by number of medals won, followed by number of gold, silver, and bronze.

See also
 2002 Winter Olympics medal table

References

External links
 

2002 Winter Olympics
2002
Winter Olympics 2002